Uzoma Okwuchi Osimkpa  is a Nigerian actress popularly known as Uzor Osimkpa. She emerged 5th in the 2012 Gulder Ultimate Search season 9.

Biography
She obtained a bachelor's degree in Economics Education from Abia State University, Nigeria.

Career
Uzor's acting career started in 2004 when she featured in the movie  shallow Waters. In 2005, she was featured in the BBC World Service Trust test series Wetin dey. The TV series Do Good and Hustle made her more prominent. Subsequently, she has featured in films and TV series which includes Tinsel, The Maze, Flatmate, Edge of Paradise, Doctors Quarters, amongst others.

Uzor Osimkpa contested and emerged fifth in the 2012 Gulder Ultimate Search.  Even though she was eliminated after breaking a rule by removing the shameful stump from her leg  as punishments for finishing last in the final challenge titled Wave your Flag

Filmography

Accolades
In 2017 Uzor was  nominated for City People Movies Awards category - The Best Upcoming Actress in an English film Uzor Osimkpa emerged fifth in the 2012 Gulder Ultimate Search, this season was held at Usaka, Obot Akara, Akwa Ibom State.

References

External links 

Living people
Year of birth missing (living people)
Abia State University alumni
Igbo actresses
21st-century Nigerian actresses
Actresses from Abia State
Actresses from Lagos